Santiago Baronetto (born 27 October 1992) is an Argentine handball player for BM Ciudad Encantada and the Argentine national team.

He represented Argentina at the 2019 World Men's Handball Championship.

References

External links
 
 
 

1992 births
Living people
Argentine male handball players
Sportspeople from Buenos Aires
Expatriate handball players
Argentine expatriate sportspeople in Spain
Handball players at the 2019 Pan American Games
Pan American Games medalists in handball
Pan American Games gold medalists for Argentina
Medalists at the 2019 Pan American Games
Handball players at the 2020 Summer Olympics
21st-century Argentine people
South American Games gold medalists for Argentina
South American Games silver medalists for Argentina
South American Games medalists in handball
Competitors at the 2018 South American Games
Competitors at the 2022 South American Games